Lykovo is a rural locality (a village) in Bolshesosnovskoye Rural Settlement, Bolshesosnovsky District, Perm Krai, Russia. The population was 87 as of 2010. The village has one street.

Geography 
Lykovo is located 12 km southeast of Bolshaya Sosnova (the district's administrative centre) by road. Zhelnino is the nearest rural locality.

References

Rural localities in Bolshesosnovsky District